Michael Brent Abernathy (born September 23, 1977) is an American former professional baseball infielder. He played in Major League Baseball (MLB) from 2001 to 2003 for the Tampa Bay Devil Rays and Kansas City Royals, and again in 2005 for the Minnesota Twins.

Career
He attended high school at The Lovett School, where he played on the school's baseball team. He was awarded the Dial Award for the national high-school scholar-athlete of the year in 1995. Abernathy was named to the All-America First Team by the American Baseball Coaches Association and Rawlings.

Abernathy was drafted by the Toronto Blue Jays in the second round of the 1996 Major League Baseball Draft. In 2000, he was traded to the Tampa Bay Devil Rays for pitchers Steve Trachsel and Mark Guthrie. He played for the gold medal-winning United States team in the 2000 Olympics, and went on to make his debut in the majors with Tampa Bay and later played with the Kansas City Royals and the Minnesota Twins. He has not been in the majors since 2005.

Abernathy was one of two Tampa Bay Devil Rays players to reach base against the Boston Red Sox on April 27, 2002, on a walk, but then was thrown out at second after Russ Johnson hit into a fielder's choice. Abernathy's plate appearance broke up Derek Lowe's bid for a perfect game. Lowe did finish the game, however, with a no-hitter.

On April 7, 2008, Abernathy signed with the Long Island Ducks of the Atlantic League. His last season in professional baseball was 2009, when he played with the Camden Riversharks.

References

External links

1977 births
Living people
American expatriate baseball players in Canada
Baseball players at the 2000 Summer Olympics
Baseball players from Atlanta
Buffalo Bisons (minor league) players
Camden Riversharks players
Columbus Clippers players
Durham Bulls players
Hagerstown Suns players
Kansas City Royals players
Long Island Ducks players
Major League Baseball second basemen
Medalists at the 2000 Summer Olympics
Minnesota Twins players
Nashville Sounds players
Olympic gold medalists for the United States in baseball
Omaha Royals players
Ottawa Lynx players
Rochester Red Wings players
Tampa Bay Devil Rays players
The Lovett School alumni